Primula sinensis, or the Chinese primrose, is a plant species in the genus Primula.

Primulin is an anthocyanin found in P. sinensis.

References

sinensis
Plants described in 1821